This list of World War I flying aces from Hungary contains the names of aces from the territory of modern-day Hungary, which formed part of the Austro-Hungarian Empire. Austria-Hungary was a constitutional union of the Austrian Empire (Cisleithania) and the Kingdom of Hungary (Transleithania) which  existed from 1867 to 1918, when it collapsed as a result of defeat in World War I.

Among the Austro-Hungarian aviators were the Hungarian-born aces listed below.

See also

 List of Austrians
 List of Hungarians
 List of World War I flying aces from Austria
 List of World War I flying aces from Austria-Hungary
 Lists of World War I flying aces

References
Notes

Bibliography
 
 

 
World War I flying aces
Hungary